Noord-Waddinxveen is a former municipality in the Dutch province of South Holland. It covered the northern half of the village Waddinxveen.

The municipality existed between 1817 and 1870, when it merged with Zuid-Waddinxveen.

References

External links
Map of the former municipality in 1868

Former municipalities of South Holland
Waddinxveen